Ben Wearing (born 8 May 1989) is a former Australian footballer.

Club career
On 28 November 2009, Ben made his senior debut for Gold Coast United starting in a four nill loss to Melbourne Victory.

Wearing was sent out on loan to VPL club Heidelberg United during the A-League and Youth League off seasons.

Honours
With Gold Coast United:
 National Youth League Championship: 2009–2010, 2010–2011

References

External links
 Gold Coast United profile

Living people
Gold Coast United FC players
Australian soccer players
1989 births
A-League Men players
Association football central defenders
People from Maitland, New South Wales
Sportsmen from New South Wales
Soccer players from New South Wales